Manila's history begins around 65,000 BC the time the Callao Man first settled in the Philippines, predating the arrival of the Negritos and the Malayo-Polynesians.  The nearby Angono Petroglyphs, are then dated to be around 3,000 BC and the earliest recorded history of Manila, the capital of the Philippines, dates back to the year 900 AD as recorded in the Laguna Copperplate Inscription.  By the thirteenth century, the city consisted of a fortified settlement and trading quarter near the mouth of the Pasig River, the river that bisects the city into north and south.

The official name of the city under its Malay aristocracy was Seludong/Selurung, which was the same name given for the general region of southwestern Luzon at that time. 

Manila became the seat of the colonial government of Spain when it gained sovereignty over the Philippine Islands in 1565. The seat of the Spanish government was situated within the fortified walls of Old Manila (now referred to as Intramuros meaning within the walls). The walls were constructed to keep out invading Chinese pirates and protect the city from native uprisings. Several communities eventually grew outside the walls of Manila. The city became the center of trade between Manila and Acapulco, which lasted for three centuries and brought the goods from the Americas to South East Asia and vice versa.

In 1762 the city was captured and then occupied by Great Britain for two years as part of the Seven Years' War. The city remained the capital of the Spanish East Indies under the government of the provisional British governor, acting through the Archbishop of Manila and the Real Audiencia. The Spanish military regrouped at in Pampanga and continued to harass the British.

In 1898, Spain ceded control of the Philippines after over three hundred year of colonial rule to the United States after the Treaty of Paris (1898), which ended the Spanish–American War. During the American Period, some semblance of city planning using the architectural designs and master plans by Daniel Burnham was done on the portions of the city south of the Pasig River.

During World War II, much of the city was destroyed during the Battle of Manila (1945) the last of the many Battles fought in Manila's history, but the city was rebuilt in after the war. It was the second most destroyed city in the world after Warsaw, Poland during World War II. The Metropolitan Manila region was enacted as an independent entity in 1975.

Etymology

Manila is the evolved Spanish form of the native placename Maynilà, which comes from the Tagalog phrase may-nilà ("where indigo is found"). Nilà is derived from the Sanskrit word  nīla (नील) which refers to indigo, and, by extension, to several plant species from which this natural dye can be extracted. The Maynilà name is more likely in reference to the presence of indigo-yielding plants growing in the area surrounding the settlement, rather than Maynilà being known as a settlement that trades in indigo dye, since the settlement was founded several hundred years before indigo dye extraction became an important economic activity in the area in the 18th century.

An inaccurate but nevertheless persistent etymology asserts the origin of the city's name as may-nilad ("where nilad is found"). Here, nilad refers to either: (incorrectly) the water hyacinth (Eichhornia crassipes), which is a recent introduction to the Philippines from South America and therefore could not have been the plant species referred to in the toponym; or (correctly) a shrub-like tree (Scyphiphora hydrophyllacea, formerly Ixora manila Blanco) found in or near mangrove swamps, and known as nilád or nilár in Tagalog.

From a linguistic perspective it is unlikely for native Tagalog speakers to completely drop the final consonant /d/ in nilad to arrive at the present form Maynilà. Historian Ambeth Ocampo also states that in all early documents the place had always been called "Maynilà" — and never referred to with a final consonant /d/. Despite the may-nilad etymology being erroneous, it continues to be perpetuated through uncritical repetition in both literature and popular imagination.

History

Prehistory

Austronesian migrations 

As with virtually all the lowland peoples of Maritime Southeast Asia, the Tagalog people who would eventually establish the fortified polity of Maynila were Austronesians. They had a rich, complex culture, with its own expressions of language and writing, religion, art, and music. This Austronesian culture was already in place before the cultural influences of China, Japan, the Indonesian thassalocracies of Srivijaya and Majapahit, and Brunei, and eventually, the western colonial powers. The core elements of this Austronesian culture also persisted despite the introduction of Buddhism, Hinduism, Islam and, later, Christianity. Elements of these belief systems were syncretistically adapted by the Tagalogs to enrich their already-existing worldviews, elements of which still persist today in the syncretistic forms known as Folk Catholicism and Folk Islam.

These Austronesian cultures are defined by their languages, and by a number of key technologies including the cultural prominence of boats, the construction of thatched houses on piles, the cultivation of tubers and rice, and a characteristic social organization typically led by a “big man” or “man of power”.

The Tagalog people and language 

Not much is known about when the Tagalog and Kapampangan peoples came to occupy the lands surrounding Manila Bay, but Linguists such as Dr. David Zorc and Dr. Robert Blust speculate that the Tagalogs and other Central Philippine ethno-linguistic groups originated in Northeastern Mindanao or the Eastern Visayas. The Tagalog language is believed to have branched out from a hypothesized "proto-language" which linguists have dubbed "Proto-Philippine language," another branch of which was the Visayan language.

Some Philippine historians such as Jaime Tiongson have asserted that some of the words used in the Laguna Copperplate Inscription, the Philippines' oldest extant written document, came from Old Tagalog, although the text itself used the Javanese Kawi script.

Early history 

As the Philippines' oldest extant written document, the LCI provides evidence that a socially complex Tagalog polity, known as Tondo, existed on the Pasig River delta as early as 900 AD - a date that also marks the beginning of written Philippine history. Tondo is presumed by most scholars to have been located on the same location as it did in the Sixteenth century: north of the Pasig River, occupying the northern part of the delta.

There are no references that state whether a settlement south of the river, on the southern part of the delta where Maynila was eventually located, also existed at the time the LCI was written. Ample archeological evidence exists, however, that the settlement of Namayan (also called Sapa) flourished further up the Pasig River some time in the tenth or eleventh century.  Legends also say that a settlement on the shores of the Bitukang Manok River (now Parian Creek), which eventually became the Pasig settlement, was already established by the thirteenth century.

Legends regarding the foundation of early Maynila 
All of the various legends regarding the foundation of early Maynila suggest the existence of an already-existing Tagalog Settlement south of the Pasig River, which rises in importance due to alliance with or annexation by a foreign power. These legends range in date from the mid-1200s to the turn of the 16th century.

Establishment through defeat of Rajah Avirjirkaya by Rajah Ahmad of Brunei ( 1258) 
According to Mariano A. Henson's genealogical research (later brought up by Majul in 1973, and by Santiago in 1990) a settlement in the Maynila area already existed by the year 1258. This settlement was ruled by "Rajah Avirjirkaya" whom Henson described as a "Majapahit Suzerain".

According to Henson, this settlement was attacked by a Bruneian commander named Rajah Ahmad, who defeated Avirjirkaya and established Maynila as a "Muslim principality".

Early references to Selurong (1360s) 

In the 14th century there is evidence of Manila being a province of the Indonesian Hindu empire of Majapahit due to the epic eulogy poem Nagarakretagama, which was dedicated to Maharaja Hayam Wuruk. Seludong/Selurung was listed in Canto 14 alongside Sulot (Sulu) and Kalka.

Under the Malay aristocracy, the city was known as Seludong/Selurung, which was the same name given for the general region of southwestern Luzon at that time, suggesting that it was the capital of Ancient Tondo. It was also known as Gintu ("The Land/Island of Gold") or Suvarnadvipa by its neighbors. The said kingdom flourished during the latter half of the Ming Dynasty as a result of trade relations with China. Ancient Tondo has always been the traditional capital of the empire. Its rulers were equivalents to kings and not mere chieftains, and they were addressed as panginuan or panginoon ("lords"), anak banwa ("son of heaven") or lakandula ("lord of the palace"). Well into the 13th century, the city consisted of a fortified settlement and trading quarter at the bay of the Pasig River, on top of previous older towns.

The conquest of Sultan Bulkiah from Brunei (1500s)

During the reign of Sultan Bolkiah in 1485 to 1521, the Sultanate of Brunei decided to break the Dynasty of Tondo's monopoly in the China trade by attacking Tondo and establishing the state of Selurung as a Bruneian satellite-state. A new dynasty under the Islamized Rajah  Salalila was also established to challenge the House of Lakandula in Tondo. Islam was further strengthened by the arrival to the Philippines of traders and proselytizers from Malaysia and Indonesia. The multiple states competing over the limited territory and people of the islands simplified Spanish colonization by allowing its conquistadors to effectively employ a strategy of divide and conquer for rapid conquest.

Warring cities period

In the mid-16th century, the areas of present-day Manila were part of larger thalassocracies governed by Muslim Rajahs. Rajah Sulayman and Rajah Matanda ruled the Muslim communities south of the Pasig River, and Lakan Dula ruled the Kingdom of Tondo, the Hindu-Buddhist community north of the river. The two Muslim communities of Sulayman and Matanda were unified into the Kingdom of Maynila. Both city-states were officially Malay-speaking and held diplomatic ties with the Bolkiah dynasty of Brunei and the sultanates of Sulu and Ternate (not to be confused with Ternate, Cavite).

Spanish period

Spanish rule 1571–1762 

Governor-General Miguel López de Legazpi, searching for a suitable place to establish his capital after being compelled to move from Cebu to Panay by Portuguese pirates, and hearing of the existence of prosperous kingdoms in Luzon, sent an expedition under  Marshal Martin de Goiti and Captain Juan de Salcedo to discover its location and potential. De Goiti anchored at Cavite, and attempted to establish his authority peacefully by sending a message of friendship to Maynilad. Rajah Sulayman, then its ruler, was willing to accept the friendship that the Spaniards were offering, but did not want to submit to its sovereignty unto them and waged war against them. As a result, De Goiti and his army attacked Maynilad in June 1570. After a stout fight, he captured the city before returning to Panay.

In 1571, the unity of the Luzon Empire was already threatened by the uneasy alliance of the Rajah Matanda of Sapa, Lakan Dula of Tondo, and Rajah Sulayman, the rajah muda or "crown prince" of Maynila and laxamana or "grand admiral" of the Macabebe Armada. Powerful states like Lubao, Betis and Macabebe became bold enough to challenge the traditional leadership of Tondo and Maynila. In about the same year, the Spaniards returned, this time led by López de Legazpi himself along with his entire force (consisting of 280 Spaniards and 600 native allies). Seeing them approach, the natives set the city on fire and fled to ancient Tondo and neighboring towns. The Spaniards occupied the ruins of Maynilad and established a settlement there. On May 19, 1571, López de Legazpi gave the title city to the colony of Manila. The title was certified on June 19, 1572. Under Spain, Manila became the colonial entrepot in the Far East. The Philippines was a Spanish colony administered under the Viceroyalty of New Spain and the Governor-General of the Philippines who ruled from Manila was sub-ordinate to the Viceroy in Mexico City.  The Manila-Acapulco Galleon trade route between the Philippines and Mexico flourished from 1571 until 1815. Manila became famous during the Manila-Acapulco trade which brought the goods as far as Mexico all the way to Southeast Asia.

Because of the Spanish presence in the area, the Chinese people, who were living in the area and engaging in free trade relations with the natives, were subjected to commercial restrictions as well as laws requiring them to pay tribute to Spanish authorities. As a result, the Chinese revolted against the Spaniards in 1574, when a force of about 3,000 men and 62 Chinese warships under the command of Limahong attacked the city. The said attempt was fruitless, and the Chinese were defeated. In order to safeguard the city from similar uprisings later, the Spanish authorities confined the Chinese residents and merchants to a separate district called Parian de Alcaceria.

On June 19, 1591, after the commencement of the construction of a fort there, López de Legazpi made overtures of friendship with Lakan Dula of Tondo, which was prudently accepted. However, the Muslim, Rajah Sulayman, refused to submit to the Spaniards and gathered together a force composed of Tagalog warriors after failing to get the support of Lakan Dula and that of the leaders of Hagonoy and Macabebe. On June 3, 1571, Sulayman led his troops and attacked the Spaniards in a decisive battle at the town of Bangkusay, but were defeated. With the destruction of Sulayman's army and the friendship with Lakan Dula, the Spaniards began to establish themselves throughout the city and its neighboring towns. Afterwards came the rapid Christianization of the natives of the city. The first missionaries to arrive were the Augustinians, followed by the Franciscans, Jesuits, Dominicans, Augustinians and other religious orders. The friars also began to establish schools and churches dedicated to the Christian faith, eventually spreading throughout Manila and beyond.

In 1595, Manila was decreed to be the capital of the Philippines, although it had already in fact served that function practically from its founding in 1571. Legazpi then ordered the creation of a municipal government or cabildo with a set of Spanish-style houses, monasteries, nunneries, churches, and schools giving birth to Intramuros. The layout of the city was haphazardly planned during this era as a set of communities surrounding the fortified walls of Intramuros (within the walls), which was the original Manila. Intramuros, one of the oldest walled cities in the Far East, was constructed and designed by Spanish Jesuit missionaries to provide protection from invading Chinese pirates and native uprisings. The walled district of Intramuros, as well as the suburbs outside Intramuros, housed a total of 1200 Spanish families and garrisoned 400 Spanish soldiers.

At various times in the following century, the Chinese rose in revolt against the Spaniards. In 1602, they set fire to Quiapo and Tondo, and for a time threatened to capture Intramuros. In 1662, they again revolted, while in 1686, a conspiracy led by Tingco plotted to kill all the Spaniards. These events led to the expulsion of the Chinese from Manila and the entire country by virtue of the decrees that were made by the Spanish authorities to that effect. However, later reconciliations nearly always permitted the continuation of the Chinese community in the city.

British occupation (1762–1764)

British forces conquered Manila in October 1762 with the city coming under British occupation until 1764 as a result of the Seven Years' War. Spain became Britain's enemy when it sided with France due to ties between their royal families. 

The British accepted the written surrender of the Spanish government in the Philippines from Archbishop Rojo and the Real Audiencia on 30 October 1762. The city remained the capital and key to the Spanish East Indies under the government of the provisional British governor, acting through the Archbishop of Manila and the Real Audiencia. The terms of surrender proposed by Archbishop Rojo and agreed to by the British leaders, secured private property, guaranteed the Roman Catholic religion and its episcopal government, and granted the citizens of the former Spanish colony the rights of peaceful travel and of trade 'as British subjects'. Under the direction of the provisional British governor, the Spanish East Indies was to be governed by the Audencia Real, the expenses of which were agreed to be paid for by Spain. The terms of surrender dated 29 October 1762 signed by Archbishop Rojo, and sealed with the Spanish Royal Seal, ceding the entire archipelago to Great Britain. This was rejected by Simón de Anda y Salazar who claimed to have been appointed Governor-General under the Statutes of the Indies.

Outside of Manila, the Spanish forces in the region regrouped in Pampanga, where Salazar established his headquarters first in Bulacan, then in Bacolor. So successful was Salazar's efforts at harassing the British that Captain Thomas Backhouse reported to the Secretary of War in London that "the enemy is in full possession of the country".

At the time of signing the treaty, the signatories were not aware that Manila had been captured by the British and was being administered by them as a colony. Consequently, no specific provision was made for the Philippines. Instead they fell under the general provision that all other lands not otherwise provided for be returned to the Spanish Crown.

An unknown number of Indian soldiers known as sepoys, who came with the British, deserted and settled in Cainta, Rizal, which explains the uniquely Indian features of generations of Cainta residents.
In January 1798 during the French Revolutionary Wars a British naval squadron entered Manila for reconnaissance, seizing three gunboats in the bloodless Raid on Manila.

Spanish rule 1764–1898 

Mexican Independence in 1821 necessitated direct rule from Spain. Under direct Spanish rule, banking, industry and education flourished more than it had in the previous two centuries. The opening of the Suez Canal in 1869 helped to facilitate direct trade and communications with Spain. Construction of bridges, roads and railways, and the expansion of the ports came to symbolize the rapid development.
 
Being the traditional seat of education and liberal thinking in the Philippines, Manila was a rich field for anticlerical propaganda. The seeds of revolution germinated in 1886 with the publication of José Rizal's book Noli Me Tangere (Touch Me Not), a novel critical of the way the Spanish friars were governing the Philippines. The Spanish government condemned the book, and Rizal was exiled to Dapitan. In 1892, he returned to Manila to found La Liga Filipina, a nationalistic organization. Later that year, in Tondo, Andrés Bonifacio founded the Katipunan, a secret organization with aim of overthrowing Spanish colonial rule.

The Katipunan movement grew until open rebellion broke out in August 1896 after its discovery by the Spaniards. Bonifacio's attack on Manila was unsuccessful. Rizal became a martyr of the revolution when the Spaniards executed him by firing squad on December 30, 1896 in Bagumbayan. After several months of fighting, a revolutionary government was formed at the Tejeros Convention in Cavite province with Emilio Aguinaldo at its head. Aguinaldo's government was also unsuccessful in its fight for independence, and as part of the Pact of Biak-na-Bato peace treaty, Aguinaldo accepted exile in Hong Kong.

American period (1898–1942)

U.S. Troops invaded Manila in 1898 and waged war with the Spaniards and Filipinos in the Spanish–American War and the Philippine–American War. Following the defeat of Spain, U.S. forces took control of the city and the islands in one of the most brutal and forgotten chapters of Philippine American history.

The American Navy, under Admiral George Dewey, defeated the Spanish squadron in the Battle of Manila Bay on May 1, 1898.

During the Battle of Manila the Americans took control of Manila from the Spanish. Admiral Dewey testified that after the battle the Spanish Governor wished to surrender to the Americans rather than the Filipinos.

In the Treaty of Paris in 1898, Spain handed over the Philippines to the United States of America for US$ 20,000,000 and ending 333 years of Spanish rule in the islands.

Having just won their independence from Spain, the Filipinos were fiercely opposed to once again being occupied. Emilio Aguinaldo proclaimed the First Philippine Republic at the Malolos Congress and had begun to build the foundations for an independent nation. Admiral Dewey, however, claimed he never recognized the Philippine Republic, as he did not have the authority to do so and did not consider it an organized government.

War broke out between the Filipinos and the Americans on February 4, 1899, the 1899 Battle of Manila, which began the Philippine–American War. The Americans pursued the retreating Filipino forces province by province, until General Emilio Aguinaldo (then president of the Republic) surrendered in Palanan, Isabela, on March 23, 1901.

Manila continued under an American military government until civil government was established for the city on July 31, 1901.

During the American Period, some semblance of city planning using the architectural designs and master plans by Daniel Burnham was done on the portions of the city south of the Pasig River.

In 1935, the United States government committed itself to granting the Philippines Independence after a ten-year transition, a period that was extended by one year due to World War II. The establishment of the General Headquarters of the Philippine Commonwealth Army was stationed in the capital city in Ermita, Manila under the Commonwealth government was active on December 21, 1935 to January 3, 1942 was followed by the Japanese Occupation and March 4, 1945 to June 30, 1946 after the liberating Battle of Manila.

World War II and Japanese occupation

Filipino and American combat units were ordered to withdraw from the city and all military installations removed on December 24, 1941 (Philippine time). That same day, Manila was declared an open city to spare the city from death and destruction. Despite this, the Japanese warplanes bombed Manila and for the first time, Manileños experienced the first air raid. Quezon issued a decree enlarging the safe zone to include outlying areas of Manila as safe zones, establishing the new administrative jurisdiction, the City of Greater Manila.

The mainly general headquarters of the Philippine Commonwealth Army was withdrawn and retreated to the military stations in Ermita, Manila. On December 24, 1941, they are closed down following the arrival and occupation of the capital city by the Japanese Imperial forces, who took control of the main general headquarters of the Commonwealth Army on January 3, 1942. Following the Japanese Occupation, the general headquarters and military camps and bases of the Philippine Commonwealth Army are used around the provinces of the Philippine Archipelago from Luzon, Visayas and Mindanao from January 3, 1942 to June 30, 1946 has openly the service and began the local military conflicts against the Japanese Occupation in this country.

The post of mayor of Greater Manila was given to Quezon's former Executive Secretary, Jorge B. Vargas. On the evening of New Year's Day of 1942, a Japanese courier delivered notice to Vargas that Japanese forces already bivouacked at Parañaque would enter Greater Manila the following day. From 9 am to 10 am of January 2, Japanese imperial forces marched into the City of Manila.

Vargas was tasked to hand over Greater Manila to the new authorities and present the remaining Filipino leaders to Japanese authorities. Vargas and the Filipino leaders present were asked to choose three options; (1) a purely Japanese military administration, (2) a dictatorial government run by a Filipino under General Artemio Ricarte who went on self-exile to Japan after the Filipino-American war, or (3) a government by commission selected by Filipinos. Vargas and the local leaders chose the third option and established the Philippine Executive Commission to manage initially Greater Manila, and was later expanded to cover the whole of the Philippines.

Vargas assumed the chairmanship of the Philippine Executive Commission and appointed to the post of Mayor of Greater Manila in 1942, Leon G. Guinto Sr., a Secretary of Labour under the Philippine Commonwealth administration of President Manuel L. Quezon. Guinto held the position of Mayor of Greater Manila until the liberation of the city.

On October 20, 1944, American and Philippine Commonwealth troops, led by American General Douglas MacArthur, began the reconquest of the Philippines. Gen. Tomoyuki Yamashita ordered the commander of Shimbu Group, Gen. Shizuo Yokoyama, to destroy all bridges and other vital installations and evacuate the city. However, units of the Imperial Japanese Navy, led by Sanji Iwabuchi, refused to leave the city. Thus, from February 3 to March 3, 1945, much of the city was destroyed during the Battle of Manila and 100,000 to 500,000 civilians were killed during the Manila Massacre. Almost 85,000 to 140,000 strong Filipino soldiers and military officers under the Philippine Commonwealth Army send the military operations around Manila from the mainly general headquarters of the Commonwealth Army in Central and Southern Luzon was aided of all 3,000 guerrilla fighters and 35,000 American liberation forces was prepare the attack around the capital city by the Imperial Japanese Marines and Army troops. As a result of these events in World War II, Manila was the second most destroyed city in the world after Warsaw, Poland during World War II. Once Manila was officially liberated, the rebuilt of the general headquarters of the Philippine Commonwealth Army with the Philippine Constabulary was relocated of the capital city on March 4, 1945 to June 30, 1946 after the liberation and prepares the engagements of the military operations in Luzon against the Japanese and helps Americans and guerrillas, Greater Manila was dissolved, and its towns returned to their pre-war status. On July 4, 1946, the Philippine flag was raised for the first time in Rizal Park. Reconstruction took place during the years following WWII.

Contemporary period

The Golden Age and the Marcos Era (1952–1965) 
With Arsenio Lacson becoming the first elected mayor in 1952 (all mayors were appointed prior to this), the City of Manila underwent The Golden Age, was revitalized, and once again became the "Pearl of the Orient", a moniker it earned before the outbreak of the war.

After Mayor Lacson's successful term in the fifties, the city was led by Mayor Antonio Villegas during most of the 60's, and Mayor Ramon Bagatsing for nearly the entire decade of the 70's until the 1986 Edsa revolution, making him the longest serving Mayor of Manila.

Mayors Lacson, Villegas, and Bagatsing are most often collectively referred to as "the Big Three of Manila" for their rather long tenures as chief executive of City Hall (continuously for over three decades, from 1952–1986), but more importantly, for their impeccable contribution to the development and progress of the City and their lasting legacy in uplifting the quality of life and welfare of the people of Manila.

The Marcos Era (1965–1986) 
During the Marcos Era, the region of the Manila Metropolitan area was enacted as an independent entity in 1975 encompassing several cities and towns, being a separate local-regional unit and the seat of government of the Philippines.

Fifth Republic (1986–present)

After the People Power Revolution, Aquino's widow, Corazon, was installed as president in 1986. During the Aquino presidency, Manila witnessed eight unsuccessful coup attempts, the most serious occurring in December 1989.

In 1992, Alfredo Lim became the mayor, and was known for his anti-crime crusades. When Lim ran for the presidency during the 1998 presidential election, his vice mayor Lito Atienza was elected as city mayor. Atienza was known for renovating most of the city's plaza, and projects that would benefit the populace. He was the Mayor of Manila for 3 terms (9 years); barred for seeking a fourth consecutive term. Lim defeated Atienza's son Ali in the 2007 city election and immediately reversed all of Atienza's projects claiming the projects made little contribution to the improvements of the city. On July 17, 2008, councilor Dennis Alcoreza filed human rights complaints before the Commission on Human Rights, against Lim, and other Manila officials. Twenty-four Manila officials also resigned because of the maltreatment of Lim's police forces.  The relationship of both parties turned bitter, with the two pitting again during the 2010 city elections in which Lim won against Atienza.

Atienza is known for selling public school campuses to private entities. The Lucky Chinatown Mall and Cityplace Condo (Megaworld Corporation) now stands used to be the site of two heritage schools: Jose Abad Santos High School and Rajah Soliman High School. It was summarily demolished despite protests from teachers and local activist.

Among the numerous controversies surrounding Lim's administration were the filing of human rights complaints against him and other city officials by councilor Dennis Alcoreza on 2008, the resignation of 24 city officials because of the maltreatment of Lim's police forces, and his bloody resolution of the Manila hostage crisis, one of the deadliest hostage crisis in the Philippines. Lim was also accused of graft and corruption, believed to be the cause of the city's bankruptcy. These allegations were later followed by a complaint in 2012 by Vice Mayor Isko Moreno and 28 city councilors which cited that Lim's statement in a meeting were "life-threatening" to them. During the 2013 elections, former President Joseph Estrada defeated Lim in the mayoral race. Estrada, despite not being a Manila resident as his family has always resided in San Juan where his sons have been mayors won by popularity.

Historical battles
The first two recorded battles in Manila occurred in 1365 in which Maharaja Hayam Wuruk invaded the kingdom of Selurong, followed by the subjugation of the Kingdom of Tondo by Sultan Bolkiah of Brunei caused moderate damage to the city. It was followed by another battle in 1571, wherein the conquistador Martin de Goiti arrived from Mexico to drive out the Muslim elite, and the city was razed to the ground. It explains the absence of any pre-Hispanic architecture in Manila. The battle of Manila in 1574, between Chinese pirate-warlord Limahong and Don Galo only produced minimal damage to Manila.

After the battle and occupation of Manila by Britain in 1762, the city was pillaged for 40 hours. The next two consecutive battles for Manila; the battle in 1896 and the battle in 1898 did little damage to the city as whole. The battle of 1899, the first battle of the Philippine–American War, caused more than 200 Filipino casualties.

During the battle of Manila in 1945 between the Japanese Empire and the Allied forces, some 100,000 to 500,000 of Manila's civilians were killed by the Japanese troops in Manila massacre. The whole city was devastated, erasing its cultural and historic identity, including the destruction of the walled city of Intramuros. Reconstruction of the city took place afterwards, with some of Manila's landmarks restored.

See also 

 Tondo (historical polity)

References

External links
 History of Manila, Philippines

Sources
 .
 , (Vol. 1, no. 3).
 .
 .
 .
 .
  ,

Further reading

Published in the 19th century
 
 
 
 

Published in the 20th century